Many of the dams and reservoirs in Brazil listed below are used primarily used to produce hydroelectric power. Other uses include flood control, irrigation and fisheries.

List

See also
List of power stations in Brazil
List of hydroelectric power stations in Brazil

Brazil
D